Eupithecia phaiosata is a moth in the family Geometridae. It was described by David Stephen Fletcher in 1978. It is found in Tanzania.

References

Moths described in 1978
phaiosata
Moths of Africa